Mark D. Ferguson is a Scottish film director, screenwriter and camera operator. He is possibly best known for his directorial and camera work on the feature film In Search of La Che.

Biography

Ferguson studied Television Production at the Glasgow Metropolitan College. After graduating, he co founded the production company Quick Off The Mark Productions with Chris Quick. In 2010, the pair teams up with Andy S. McEwan to write and produce their first feature film In Search of La Che which starred Duncan Airlie James in the leading role of John Tavish. The film premiered at the Glasgow Film Theatre on 9 November 2011. The film received mixed reviews from critics on both sides of the Atlantic. Duane Martin of Rogue Cinema said "As mockumentaries go, this one is a bit of a mixed bag. Some of the characters, and a lot of the story works quite well, but there are a couple of characters and bits of the story that either fall flat or just don't work at all." Nicholas Rapp of 'The Movie Banter' said "What director Mark D. Ferguson and Andy S. McEwan got right was the element of insecurity within the documentary style. Their funds were creatively utilized, which is commendable." The film was selected to appear in the spring showcase of the 2014 American Online Film Awards.

In 2012, Ferguson co wrote directed the short film Mr Cheval and was an associate producer on The Greyness of Autumn. In 2014, he shot for the first time in 4k resolution for the short family film Minion Vs Minon which was produced in association with Futurist Film Ltd for Vue Cinemas. In October of that year, Quick Off The Mark Productions celebrated its 5th birthday. He is currently working on the short film Agley.

On 14 October 2015, it was announced that Ferguson would be moving to Canada and that Quick Off The Mark Productions would close in February 2016.

Filmography

Awards

References

External links

Quick Off The Mark Productions

1986 births
Living people
British film directors
Scottish film producers
Scottish film directors
Scottish screenwriters